Khabar or Khabr or Khebr may refer to:

 Khabar, Baft, a village in Iran
 Khabar, Shahr-e Babak, a village in Iran
 Khabar Rural District (Baft County), an administrative unit in Iran
 Khabar Rural District (Shahr-e Babak County), an administrative unit in Iran
 El Khabar (The News), a daily newspaper in Algeria
 Khabar Agency, a Kazakhstani news agency

See also
 Kabar (disambiguation)
 Akhbar (disambiguation)